Music Maker may refer to:

 Music Maker (label), an American non-profit blues publisher
 Magix Music Maker, a digital audio software product

See also
 Music Makers (disambiguation)